Marvel HeroClix: Infinity Challenge is a 2002 board game published by WizKids.

Gameplay
Marvel Heroclix is a superhero tactical miniatures game.

Infinity Challenge is the first Marvel Heroclix set produced by WizKids released May 2002 and retired June 2004. It is also the first Heroclix set produced.

Set
The set consists of the following characters made into figures:

Reception
The reviewer from the online second volume of Pyramid called the game "quite a deal" for the price.

Marvel HeroClix: Infinity Challenge won the 2002 Origins Award for Best Science Fiction Or Fantasy Board Game.

References

Board games introduced in 2002
Clix (miniatures) games
Licensed board games
Marvel Comics games
Miniatures games
Origins Award winners
WizKids games

pt:Infinity Challenge (heroclix)